Frank Gerard Burke (April 22, 1927 – November 30, 2015) served as Acting Archivist of the United States from April 16, 1985, to December 4, 1987. He received his Ph.D. from the University of Chicago.

Dr. Burke joined the staff of the National Archives in 1967 as an information retrieval specialist, after holding previous positions at the University of Chicago library and the Manuscript Division of the Library of Congress. He was one of the first National Archives employees to advocate the development of computer software for storage of archival information.
 He succeeded Robert M. Warner. He subsequently taught at the University of Maryland College of Information Studies (then known as the College of Library and Information Services), and served as president of the Society of American Archivists for 1991–92. He died from complications of Alzheimer's disease on November 30, 2015.

References

External links
Archivists of the United States, 1934–present

1927 births
American archivists
2015 deaths
Presidents of the Society of American Archivists
Reagan administration personnel